Andrés Baiz Ochoa (born 1975), also known as Andi Baiz, is a Colombian film director and screenwriter. As a film director, his first feature was Satanás, based on the novel of the same name. He is known also for directing the film The Hidden Face and for the TV series Metástasis and Narcos.

Life
He went to Colegio Bolivar and later graduated from New York University Tisch School of the Arts with a major in Film and TV and a minor in Cinema Studies. After graduating he was mentored by French director Raphael Nadjari, with whom he produced four horror short films. He then worked for the video production company Centro-Films as producer, director and editor for two years. He also worked as a film critic for Loft magazine between 2001–2004. He also worked in the production department of five feature films: Bringing Out the Dead, Zoolander, Cremaster 2, Maria Full of Grace and The Fittest. His short film Hoguera (Bonfire) was selected to participate in 2007 Cannes Director's Fortnight. Baiz has written and directed five short films, three music videos and one documentary. Satanás was his debut feature film.

Filmography

Feature films

TV Series

Short films

References

External links

1975 births
Living people
Colombian film directors
Colombian screenwriters
Male screenwriters
Colombian film producers
Tisch School of the Arts alumni